Bosnek is a village in western Bulgaria, located in Pernik Municipality of Pernik Province. It is known as the gateway for tourism into the karstic landscape of the Vitosha massif area. The village is downstream from a famous spring, called "living water", and is near the Duhlata cave, the longest in Bulgaria.

It has a population of 260 people (as of 2021).

References

Villages in Pernik Province